Clifford Gordon Eade (24 May 1933 – 19 August 2017) was an Australian rules footballer who played with Richmond in the Victorian Football League (VFL).

Notes

External links 
		

2017 deaths
1933 births
Australian rules footballers from Victoria (Australia)
Richmond Football Club players
Box Hill Football Club players